The 1995 Campeonato Paulista de Futebol Profissional da Primeira Divisão - Série A1 was the 94th season of São Paulo's top professional football league. Corinthians  won the championship by the 21st time. Bragantino, Ponte Preta and XV de Piracicaba were relegated.

Championship
The championship was disputed in a double round-robin format, with the seven best teams qualifying to the Final phase, and being joined by the champion of that year's Second level. then, the teams were divided into two groups of four, and the winner of each group would play the Finals. The bottom three in the First phase would be relegated.

First phase

Final phase

Group 1

Group 2

Finals

|}

Top Scores

References

Campeonato Paulista seasons
Paulista